August Diehl (born 4 January 1976) is a German actor, primarily known to international audiences for playing Gestapo major Dieter Hellstrom in Quentin Tarantino's Inglourious Basterds and Michael "Mike" Krause, Evelyn Salt's husband, in the movie Salt. He is also known for his leading roles in the films The Counterfeiters (2007), The Young Karl Marx (2017), and Terrence Malick's A Hidden Life (2019).

Life and career
Diehl was born in West Berlin. His father is actor Hans Diehl, his mother is a costume designer and his brother is a composer. His family was frequently moving around. Diehl spent his childhood in Auvergne, France and moved back to Germany when he was nine years old. The family lived in Hamburg, Vienna, and Düsseldorf. Growing up in a family of artists, at the age of 18, he played Franz Mohr in a school theatre production of Die Räuber by Friedrich Schiller. After passing the Abitur exams, Diehl studied acting at the renowned Hochschule für Schauspielkunst Ernst Busch in Berlin.

In 2000, he was named one of European film's Shooting Stars by the European Film Promotion.

Personal life
Diehl was married to actress Julia Malik, but the marriage ended amicably in 2016. He has two children with Malik: a daughter born in May 2009 and a son born in 2012. Diehl plays the guitar and speaks German, Spanish, French, and English.

Filmography

Film

Television

Theatre

Awards and nominations

References

External links

1976 births
20th-century German male actors
21st-century German male actors
Ernst Busch Academy of Dramatic Arts alumni
German Film Award winners
German male film actors
Living people
Male actors from Berlin
Outstanding Performance by a Cast in a Motion Picture Screen Actors Guild Award winners
Waldorf school alumni